Lefter is a masculine given name. People named Lefter include:

 Lefter Küçükandonyadis (1924-2012), Turkish footballer
 Lefter Maliqi, Albanian politician
 Lefter Millo (1966-1997), Albanian footballer
 Lefter Koka (born 1964), Albanian politician

Albanian masculine given names